Issikiopteryx is a genus of moths in the family Lecithoceridae.

Species
Issikiopteryx aurolaxa (Wu & Liu, 1993)
Issikiopteryx chinanensis Park, 2003
Issikiopteryx corona (C.S. Wu & Y.Q. Liu, 1993)
Issikiopteryx corythista (Meyrick, 1918)
Issikiopteryx fornicata (C.S. Wu & Y.Q. Liu, 1993)
Issikiopteryx japonica Moriuti, 1973
Issikiopteryx nigeriflava Liu & Wang, 2013
Issikiopteryx obtusanglua Fan & Li, 2008
Issikiopteryx ophrysa (Wu & Liu, 1993)
Issikiopteryx parelongata Liu & Wang, 2013
Issikiopteryx rotundiconcava Fan & Li, 2008
Issikiopteryx sphaeristis (Meyrick, 1908)
Issikiopteryx suiyangensis Liu & Wang, 2013
Issikiopteryx taipingensis Park, 2003
Issikiopteryx trichacera (Wu & Liu, 1993)
Issikiopteryx valvispinata Fan & Li, 2008
Issikiopteryx zonophaera (Meyrick, 1935)

References

 , 2008: The genus Issikiopteryx (Lepidoptera: Lecithoceridae): Checklist and descriptions of new species. Zootaxa 01725 : 53- 60. Abstract: 
 , 2013: Three new species of the genus Issikiopteryx Moriuti, 1973 (Lepidoptera: Lecithoceridae: Lecithocerinae) from China. Zootaxa 3669 (1): 037–042. Abstract: 
 , 1973: A new genus and two new species of the Japanese Microlepidoptera (Timyridae and Oecophoridae). Tyô to Ga 23 (2): 31-38. Full article: .
 , 2003: Three new species of Lecithoceridae (Lepidoptera) from Taiwan. Journal of Asia-Pacific Entomology 6 (1): 15-19. Full article: 
 , 1993: A new genus and four new species of Lecithocerinae from China (Lepidoptera: Lecithoceridae). Sinozoolia 10: 347-354.

 
Lecithocerinae
Moth genera